Empresa Líneas Marítimas Argentinas (ELMA) was an Argentine cargo shipping line formed on September 30, 1960, after Juan Perón nationalised the shipping industry.
The Argentine Maritime Lines Company involved the merger of two companies, both state: the Merchant Fleet of the State (FME) and Argentina Fleet of Navigation of Ultramar (FANU). It served Argentina's foreign trade until the 1990s, when the government of Carlos Menem declared its dissolution. At its peak its fleet had more than 60 ships (approximately 700,000 tonnes DW). Ships sailed to Northern Europe, the United Kingdom, the Baltic Sea, the Mediterranean, the east coasts of the United States of America and Canada, the Gulf of Mexico, the Pacific, the Middle East and Far East and Africa.

World War II ships
In 1949 she was sold to Flota Argentina de Navegación de Ultramar, Buenos Aires. In 1961 she was sold to Empresa Líneas Marítimas Argentinas, Buenos Aires. In 1972 she was scrapped at Campana, Argentina. 

Other ships purchased
 Park ship: SS Kootenay Park (2)

ELMA and the Argentine naval industry
During the 1960s a fleet renewal plan was put in place, giving priority to constructions in Argentine shipyards. Lago Argentino, Lago Aluminé and Almirante Stewart ships were built by State Shipyards and Naval Factories ( Astilleros y Fabricas Navales del Estado- AFNE). After these, three more were built: Río de la Plata, Río Paraná and Rio Calchaquí. With these successes five more ships were built: Río Cincel, Río Teuco, Río Deseado, Río Gualeguay and Río Iguazú.

The shipyards ASTARSA ( Astilleros Argentinos Río de La Plata S.A.) built the ships Río Limay, Río Esquel and Río Olivia. A series of six ships were built: Almirante Storni, Neuquén II, Libertador General José de San Martín, Dr Atilio Malvagni, President Ramón S. Castillo and General Manuel Belgrano. Then a series of three ships: Buenos Aires II, Córdoba and La Pampa. This brought the ELMA fleet to 23 ships totaling just over 272,000 tonnes. The last additions to the fleet came with three refrigerated vessels from Alianza Shipyards ( Astilleros Alianza): Glaciar Perito Moreno, Glaciar Viedma and Glaciar Ameghino. And two AFNE container ships: Isla Gran Malvina and Isla Soledad.

Falklands war 
In 1982 the ELMA ships Río Carcarañá and Formosa participated in the Falklands war ( Guerra de las Malvinas), which resulted in the sinking of the former by British fire and the damage of the latter due to friendly fire.

Demise 

ELMA was dismantled during the 1990s as part of president Carlos Menem's 1990s state reform laws.

References

External links 
 ELMA at theshipslist.com
   History, fleet and other information - HISTARMAR (accessed 2018-11-17)

Shipping companies of Argentina
Argentine companies established in 1960
1996 disestablishments in Argentina
Defunct transport companies of Argentina